Michaela Dietz (born November 1, 1982) is a Korean-American voice actress whose professional career started in 2005. She voiced the character of the lost 4th dinosaur member Riff on the PBS children's television series Barney & Friends, Amethyst on the Cartoon Network television series Steven Universe and Steven Universe Future, Dolly Dalmatian on Disney's 101 Dalmatian Street, Pita in Fallout 76, Vee on Disney's The Owl House, and Darryl McGee on Disney’s The Ghost and Molly McGee.

Early life and career
Dietz was born in Incheon, South Korea on November 1, 1982, then was adopted and raised in Cooperstown, New York at three months old. She studied International Studies at Middlebury College. She has spoken about how her experience as an adoptee inspires her performance as Amethyst on Steven Universe.

Dietz began acting on television in 2005 with the role Ellie in Discover Me. She later appeared in a short in 2009 entitled Red, Black & Blonde as an Auditioning Dancer #1 and Interracial Couple #3 in K-Town.

Later career
Dietz has voiced ongoing characters in two American children's animated TV series, Riff in Barney & Friends and Amethyst in Steven Universe and its epilogue series Steven Universe Future. However, her role as Amethyst was the first time she had voiced an animated character.

She voiced Amethyst in the mobile phone games Cartoon Network Superstar Soccer: Goal (2014), Steven Universe: Attack the Light (2015), Steven Universe: Save the Light (2017), Steven Universe: Unleash the Light (2019). In 2019, she voiced Amethyst in the TV film, Steven Universe: The Movie, a continuation from the Steven Universe animated series. She also voiced Amethyst in an anti-racism PSA by Rebecca Sugar and Ian Jones-Quartey in 2021.

She has since go on to voice several characters for Disney, such as Dolly Dalmatian on 101 Dalmatian Street, Vee on The Owl House and Darryl McGee on The Ghost and Molly McGee. She also voiced Glass Boy in the Adventure Time: Distant Lands episode, "Obsidian", and Danelda in two episodes of Mighty Magiswords.

She also voiced Blue Behemoth in Kid Cosmic, and Dottie in two episodes of Tuca & Bertie. Additionally, she voiced various characters in Monsters at Work, Jennifer in an episode of Fairfax, and Michelle Green in four episodes of Craig of the Creek. She recently voiced Ariel in the 2022 episode, "Ariel Force One", of Middlemost Post.

She also voiced characters in video games such as Grand Theft Auto V, Fallout 76: Wastelanders, and Lego Dimensions.

In 2021, she voiced Tomas in the film, The Witcher: Nightmare of the Wolf. The previous year she provided narration for a series of narrated videos which were part of a Cartoon Network digital series celebrating Asian American and Pacific Islander Heritage Month.

Filmography

Notes

References

External links
 
 

1982 births
Living people
American actresses of Korean descent
American adoptees
American film actresses
American video game actresses
People from Incheon
American voice actresses
Middlebury College alumni
Place of birth missing (living people)
South Korean adoptees
21st-century American actresses